The Central District of Maku County is in West Azerbaijan province, Iran. At the National Census in 2006, its population was 84,516 in 19,238 households. The following census in 2011 counted 70,133 people in 18,427 households. At the latest census in 2016, the district had 75,075 inhabitants in 21,490 households.

References 

Maku County

Districts of West Azerbaijan Province

Populated places in West Azerbaijan Province

Populated places in Maku County